The 2013 Heart of Dallas Bowl was played on January 1, 2013, at the Cotton Bowl in Dallas, Texas, as one of the 2012–13 NCAA football bowl games. The game featured a matchup between the Purdue Boilermakers football team and the Oklahoma State Cowboys football team. ESPNU televised the game.

Teams

Purdue Boilermakers

Oklahoma State Cowboys

Game summary

Scoring

Statistics

References

External links
 Game summary at ESPN

Heart of Dallas Bowl
First Responder Bowl
Oklahoma State Cowboys football bowl games
Purdue Boilermakers football bowl games
January 2013 sports events in the United States
Heart of Dallas Bowl
2010s in Dallas
2013 in Texas